HiLCoE School of Computer Science and Technology is a private college in Addis Ababa, Ethiopia. The name HiLCoE stands for Higher Learning Center of Excellence. A specialized computer science institution, it was established in January 1997 by two information technology professionals, Ahmed Hussien (PhD) and Nassir Dino (PhD). Now located at the heart of Addis Ababa, Arat Kilo, HiLCoE offers undergraduate and postgraduate degrees in Computer Science and Software Engineering. With proper accreditation from the Ministry of Education, the institution launched two Masters programs in Software Engineering and Computer Science in September 2009. It now has begun offering undergraduate courses in software engineering.

Notable alumni
 Samrawit Fikru, founder and CEO of Hybrid Designs

References

External links
 

Universities and colleges in Ethiopia
Education in Addis Ababa

de:Universität Addis Abeba
ja:アディスアベバ大学